Stardust Circus (established in the early 1990s) is a circus that tours in Australia. Its annual performance season lasts from January to late November, touring Australia from the remotest towns to the largest cities.
 
The circus was established by the Lennon and West families, two circus families with tradition going back to the late 19th century. It is a very traditional form of circus and is one of only two circuses left in Australia with big cats in their programme.

Stardust Circus showcases a wide variety of circus arts such as tumblers, solo trapeze, acrobats, teeter board, aerial silks, cloud swing, flying trapeze and clowns. Animals include liberty horses (performing dressage without rider and on signals alone), liberty Welsh mountain ponies, monkeys, goats, pigs, elephants, tigers, lions, and dogs.

Janice Lennon's daughter Natalie married Rudy Weber and they run Webers Circus.

See also
List of circuses and circus owners

References

External links
 
 Stardust Circus performance details, Only Melbourne
 , A Current Affair, Adelaide

Australian circuses
1990s establishments in Australia
Companies established in the 1990s